Sanshodhan is a 1996 Indian film on the theme of reservation of women's seats in local self-government, produced by National Film Development Corporation of India (NFDC)  and United Nations Children's Fund (UNICEF). The film, directed by Govind Nihalani starred Manoj Bajpayee, Vanya Joshi and Ashutosh Rana among others.

Plot
The story is about the Latest Amendment announced by the government for reserving one third of the seats in every Village Panchayat (council) for females. It shows how the female leaders find difficulties in raising their voices in the world all of men. Its also about how the intermediaries take most of the money sent by the government and very little reaches the actual receiver.

At Parmino, the local village committee is all male. But suddenly comes the announcement that an amendment has been passed in the Indian constitution asking for the committee to have women as one third of them. The village head, Ratan and members decide to let the women in their families contest on the reserved seats in the hope that they would continue to have their writ run. While Ratan Singh asks his son, Inder, to get Manju, his wife, to contest, the other members get their wives to contest. Also asked to contest is Vidya, the newly marred bride of a poor store owner, Bhanwar, who is indebted to the village head. But Vidya turns the tables on them, asking them to account for the funds for the partially built school.

Cast
Manoj Bajpayee as Bhanwar
Harish Khanna as Hariya
Ashutosh Rana as Clerk
Lalit Parimoo as Inder Singh 
Kavita Rayirath. As Manju 
Anupam Shyam as Ratan Singh

References

External links
 
 Amazon
 UNICEF IEC eWarehouse

1996 films
1990s Hindi-language films
Films scored by Vishal Bhardwaj
Films directed by Govind Nihalani